is a Japanese model and actress who is affiliated with FirstOrder. She is best known for her role as Mai Takatsukasa/Maiden of Fate, the main heroine of the Kamen Rider series Kamen Rider Gaim.

Biography
In 2008, Shida won the 16th Pichimo Audition Grand Prize. In 2008, she debuted in the television drama, Triangle. In June 2012, Shida became a member of the idol group Yumemiru Adolescence. In April 2013, she graduated from Pichi Lemon. On May 1, 2013, Shida became an exclusive model in the June issue of Popteen. On September 22, 2014, her first solo photo book, Yuumi was released. On April 22, 2015, Shida (as Mai Takatsukasa) sang in her first solo single "Lights of My Wish".

She graduated from Yumemiru Adolescence on December 20, 2019. Her first photobook after graduation from the group, RESTART, was released on May 12, 2021.

On June 30, 2021, she announced on Twitter that she had left Tambourine Artists due to her contract expiring.

On April 29, 2022, she announced on her YouTube channel and Instagram profile that she had married a non-celebrity, and will be expecting a child in summer 2022. On July 30, she gave birth to a baby girl.

Discography

Singles

Filmography

TV series

Films

Games

Bibliography

References

External links
 Official profile at FirstOrder 
 
 

1997 births
Living people
Japanese female models
21st-century Japanese actresses
People from Ichinoseki, Iwate
Actors from Iwate Prefecture